The Boston Jail may refer to:

In Boston, Massachusetts:

 Boston Gaol (Massachusetts), off Court St. (1635-1822)
 Leverett Street Jail (1822-1851)
 Charles Street Jail (built 1851)